Karim Bare (born October 28, 1983) is a Nigerien former swimmer, who specialized in sprint freestyle events. Bare qualified for the men's 100 m freestyle at the 2000 Summer Olympics in Sydney, by receiving a Universality place from FINA without meeting a standard entry time. He participated in an unprecedented first heat against two other swimmers Farkhod Oripov of Tajikistan and Eric Moussambani of Equatorial Guinea. Before the race began, Bare plunged into the pool, along with Oripov, beating the gun, and were eventually disqualified for a false start, leaving Moussambani as the last man standing.

References

1983 births
Living people
Olympic swimmers of Niger
Swimmers at the 2000 Summer Olympics
Nigerien male freestyle swimmers
21st-century Nigerien people